The Dewar Cup Port Talbot was an indoor tennis event held one time and played at Port Talbot, Wales as part of the Dewar Cup circuit of indoor tournaments held throughout the United Kingdom.

Finals

Men's singles

Women's singles

Women's doubles

References

Defunct tennis tournaments in the United Kingdom
Tennis tournaments in Wales
Indoor tennis tournaments